Events from the year 1318 in Ireland.

Incumbent 
Lord: Edward II

Events 
10 May – Battle of Dysert O'Dea: The Hiberno-Norman Richard de Clare is defeated and killed by Conor O'Dea in alliance with O'Briens, MacNamaras and Ó hEithirs.
29 September – Alexander de Bicknor arrives in Ireland.
14 October – Battle of Faughart, aka Battle of Dundalk: a Hiberno-Norman force defeats a Scots-Irish army commanded by Edward Bruce (who is killed in the battle), ending the Bruce campaign in Ireland.
Beginning of the Kildare Supremacy.
William FitzJohn, Bishop of Ossory appointed Lord Chancellor of Ireland
Cork City was given an English Royal Charter and for many centuries was an outpost of Old English culture.

Births

Deaths 
10 May – Richard de Clare, Thomas de Lees, Henry de Capella, James de Caunteton, John de Caunteton, all killed at Dysart O'Dea.
Gilbert de Roache "killed at Ross by the burgesses of Ross."
 Edward Bruce of Scotland killed in battle.

References

 
1310s in Ireland
Ireland
Years of the 14th century in Ireland